The Archaeological Museum of Butrint was opened in 1938 to highlight the plentiful, and largely Graeco-Roman finds, from the Italian Archaeological Mission of the 1920s and 1930s, led by Luigi Maria Ugolini and was reopened during the 1950s-1960s, in the premises of the Venetian fortress within the acropolis of the ancient city. It contained the plentiful Graeco-Roman archaeological finds from the Italian Archaeological Mission of the period between the two World Wars (1928- 1940), that eventually survived the devastation of World War II.

History 
The beginning of systematic excavations in Butrint, by Albanian archaeologists during the years 1960-1980, significantly increased the number of archaeological objects and monuments which were presented in this museum. The museum has had several reconstructions, of which the reconstruction of 1988, can be mentioned as the time when it took a more complete form, presenting the centuries-long history of the ancient city. During this time, the museum staff consisted in one director and one manager who depended directly from the Institute of Archeology. The museum functioned until 1991, when it closed and remained so until 2005. The early 1990s and especially 1997, were fatal for some of the objects that were stolen from the museum premises. However, the museum building continued to be used during this period, by archaeologists who stored the finds of the archeological excavation in the premises. In summer 2005, the museum was renovated and enriched with archaeological finds from the excavations of the joint project of the Institute of Archaeology and the Butrint Foundation starting from 1994. Its reopening was made possible thanks to the cooperation and financial contribution of the Institute of Archaeology, Butrint Foundation, AG Leventis Foundation, Pakard Humanitarian Institute and Butrint National Park. In 2008, the Butrint Museum continued to function under the auspices of the Butrint National Park (Butrint Coordination and Administration Office) as it, until then, was under the auspices of the Institute of Archaeology (currently the Centre for Albanological Studies). The year 2008 signed also the return to the museum of the statues of Apollo and Artemis stolen from the museum in 1997. Currently, about 1325 objects (stone, bone, ceramic, glass, statue, coins, etc.) are displayed in the museum. These objects have been found not only from archeological excavations within Butrint, but also from the surroundings such as Diasporit, Kalivo, Xarra, Vrina plain, as well as Finiq. The presentation of the smaller inhabited centres in the surroundings of Butrint, enables the better understanding of the preconditions for the rise and development of Butrint during the Hellenistic and Roman periods.

Collections 
The entire collections of the museum is presented on the basis of three criteria namely; 

 the chronological one, which aims to display the development of the city in different periods of time from the prehistory (Stone Age) to its decline during the Middle Ages; 
 the thematic one, to show aspects from everyday economic and social life such as handicrafts, trade, relations with the region and the Mediterranean, art, religion, education, etc.; 
 the didactic one that is developed through the use of information panels, maps, sketches, models, three-dimensional reconstructions of the main monuments. The rich collection and the inspiring landscape have turned it into one of the most visited archeological centers in Albania. The Virtual tour of this museum is available through the webpage of the Ministry of Culture of the Republic of Albania.

See also 
 Butrint
 Ali Pasha Castle
 Butrint National Park
 List of museums in Albania

Bibliography 
 Neritan Ceka, Buthrotum (translated from Albanian by Pranvera Xhelo), Migjeni, Tirana, 2002.
 
 
 
 Ugolini L. M., Butrinto il Mito D'Enea, gli Scavi. Rome: Istituto Grefico Tiberino, 1937 (reprint Tirana: Istituto Italiano di Cultura, 1999)

References

External links 

 Archaeological Museum of Butrint
 Archaeological Museum of Butrint 3D
Oliver J. Gilkes: How the Goddess lost her head. The myth and reality of the looting of Butrint. (2002)
The Discovery of Butrint. In: Archeology. A publication of the Archaeological Institute of America. (January 2000)

Butrint
Museums in Albania
Tourist attractions in Vlorë County